The Namibian Democratic Movement for Change (Nam DMC) is a Namibian political party. NMDC contested the 2004 election, but received just 4,138 votes, short of the minimum needed for a seat in the National Assembly. The party was founded in October 2003 under the umbrella of the Democratic Turnhalle Alliance but left it prior to the 2004 election due to an internal power struggle. In January 2008, the NMDC's leader was Frans Goagoseb. In January 2009, the party's leader was Joseph Kauandenge.

Policies
The NMDC said that Israel's actions during the 2008–2009 Israel–Gaza conflict were a reflection on their lack of "compassion and humility" while also calling for an immediate ceasefire.

Electoral results
The NMDC received the most votes from the Omaheke Region with 1549. It was more than 37% of the party's total votes and earned them 5th place out of 9 parties in the region.

2009
In September 2009, the Nam DMC launched its campaign for the 2009 elections. Party Secretary Kauandenge said that the party list for the National Assembly would place women and youth at high positions. The party also planned to launch the campaign publicly in Gobabis, Omaheke Region, possibly by the end of September 2009.

List of candidates for the National Assembly
In October 2009, the party listed the following list of candidates for the National Assembly of Namibia It was notable for only listing 25 names, rather than the customary 72. It included only 4 women.

List

 1. Chief Frans Migub ǀGoagoseb
 2. Joseph Kauandenge
 3. Benjamin Jagger
 4. Maria Lourence
 5. Gustav Hengari
 6. David Klaas Eiseb
 7. Don Kuzatjike
 8. Josef Mberira
 9. Kennedy Uetujandja Kauuova
 10. Adries Bezuidenhout
 11. Memory Hipondoka
 12. Josua Hange
 13. Charlien Hoko
 14. Jowy Makono
 15. Zebald Kaunatjike
 16. Nelson Tjerivanga
 17. Ernst Gariseb
 18. Stephanus Awarab
 19. Kennedy Kutako
 20. Iherikua Katjinyaa
 21. Getrude Uiras
 22. Tina Swartbooi
 23. Petrus Doeseb
 24. Ehrenfriede Tjikundisa
 25. Marichen Naris

References

Political parties in Namibia
Popular Democratic Movement
Political parties established in 2003
2003 establishments in Namibia